Irma Clark-Coleman (born April 14, 1937) is a politician from the U.S. state of Michigan. She was a Democratic member of the Michigan Senate, representing the 3rd district from 2003 to 2010. Previously she was a member of the Michigan House of Representatives from 1999 to 2002.

Early life and career 
Clark-Coleman attended Detroit Public Schools and holds a B.A. and M.A. in communications from Wayne State University. Beginning in 1967, Clark-Coleman held a variety of positions in Wayne County government; starting as a stenographer, and eventually serving as Assistant Director for Public Information to the county Road Commission, Media Relations Manager for Wayne County Executive William Lucas, Press Secretary to County Executive Ed McNamara and Director of Human Relations. Clark Coleman retired from Wayne County in 1998.

Family 
Clark-Coleman is married to Rev. Ron D. Coleman, Sr., pastor of God Land Unity Church. Clark-Coleman has two children.

Political career 
In 1991, Clark-Coleman was appointed to the Detroit Board of Education - and served in that capacity until 1998. Clark-Coleman served as the board's vice president and president (1996–1998).

Clark-Coleman was elected to the Michigan House of Representatives (district 11) in 1998 - and re-elected in 2000. In 2002, she was elected to the Michigan State Senate - and re-elected in 2006. Clark-Coleman served on the Senate Appropriations Committee. Under the term limits provisions of Michigan's Constitution, Clark-Coleman was barred from seeking re-election in 2010.

Electoral history
2006 election for Michigan State Senate - Michigan 3rd District

{| class="wikitable"
|-
! Name
! Percent  
|-
| Irma Clark-Coleman (D) (inc.)
|   82.5%
|-
| Paul E. Sophiea (R)
|   17.5%
|-
|}

2006 election for Michigan State Senate - Michigan 3rd District (Democratic primary)

{| class="wikitable"
|-
! Name
! Percent  
|-
| Irma Clark-Coleman (inc.)
|   61.4%
|-
| Alison Vaughn
|   16.6%%
|-
|}

2002 election for Michigan State Senate - Michigan 3rd District

{| class="wikitable"
|-
! Name
! Percent  
|-
| Irma Clark-Coleman (D)
|   80.6%
|-
| Jose A. Hernandez II (R)
|   19.4%
|-
|}

2002 election for Michigan State Senate - Michigan 3rd District (Democratic primary)

{| class="wikitable"
|-
! Name
! Percent  
|-
| Irma Clark-Coleman
|   63.4%
|-
| Ronald J. Tafelski
|   15.7%
|-
|Doug Thomas 
|  12.8%
|-
|}

References

External links 
Michigan Senate - Irma Clark-Coleman
Project Vote Smart - Senator Irma Clark-Coleman (MI) profile
Follow the Money - Irma Clark-Coleman
2006 2004 campaign contributions
Michigan Bureau of Elections - Irma Clark-Coleman (State Senate) campaign finance reports and data
Michigan Bureau of Elections - Irma Clark (State House) campaign finance reports and data
Michigan Senate Democratic Caucus
Michigan Liberal - SD03

1937 births
Living people
Politicians from Detroit
Wayne State University alumni
Women state legislators in Michigan
Members of the Detroit Board of Education
Democratic Party Michigan state senators
African-American women in politics
African-American state legislators in Michigan
Democratic Party members of the Michigan House of Representatives
20th-century American women politicians
20th-century American politicians
21st-century American women politicians
21st-century American politicians
20th-century African-American women
20th-century African-American politicians
21st-century African-American women
21st-century African-American politicians